Emilia Schüle (born 28 November 1992 in Blagoveshchensk) is a Russian-born German actress.

Career 

Emilia Schüle was born in 1992 in Russia to an ethnic German family. When she was one year old, she moved to Berlin with her parents. She took professional dance classes in modern dance, street dance and ballet when she was eight years old.

After she participated in the workshop Talents Getting Started in 2005, she appeared in several commercials for Arcor, IKEA, Clearasil and Deutsche Telekom. After further appearances in the television movies Guten Morgen, Herr Grothe and Manatu – Nur die Wahrheit rettet dich where she got her first leading roles, she had her film breakthrough in 2008, when she starred next to Anke Engelke, Armin Rohde and Piet Klocke in the movie Freche Mädchen.

Her next major role was in 2009 in the movie  as Sophie, alongside the young actors and brothers, Wilson Gonzalez and Jimi Blue Ochsenknecht. In 2010 she appeared in Rock It! and Freche Mädchen 2.

In September 2021, Schüle was announced to play Marie Antoinette in the Canal+ and BBC series of the same name created by Deborah Davis.

Filmography 

 2005: Nichts weiter als (short film)
 2006: Guten Morgen, Herr Grothe
 2007: Manatu – Nur die Wahrheit rettet dich
 2008: Freche Mädchen
 2008: Brüderchen und Schwesterchen
 2008: Lucky Fritz
 2009: Meine wunderbare Familie
 2009: 4 Yoginis
 2009: 
 2009: Faktor 8 – Der Tag ist gekommen
 2010: Rock It!
 2010: Freche Mädchen 2
 2010: Aschenputtel
 2011: Die letzte Spur – Alexandra, 17 Jahre
 2011: Isenhart – Die Jagd nach dem Seelenfänger
 2012: Nemez
 2012–2014: Add a Friend (TV series)
 2013: In einem wilden Land 
 2015: , as Sanja
 2015: Boy 7
 2015: 
 2016: , as Lena
 2016: 
 2016: Ku'damm 56 (TV miniseries)
 2017: Charité (TV series), as Hedwig Freiberg
 2017: High Society, as Anabel von Schlacht
 2017: Berlin Station (TV series), as Lena Ganz
 2017: Simpel
 2017: Es war einmal Indianerland
 2017: Prof. Wall im Bordell
 2018: Ku'damm 59 (TV miniseries)
 2018: Axel der Held
 2019: Treadstone (TV series)
 2019: Prof. Wall im Bordell
 2019: Traumfabrik
 2020: Narziss und Goldmund
 2021: Ku'damm 63 (TV miniseries) 
 2021: Die Vergesslichkeit der Eichhörnchen
 2022: Marie Antoinette'' (TV series)

Awards 

Undine Award
 2008 – Nominated – Best young lead actress in a feature film

References

External links 
 

1992 births
Living people
German film actresses
German child actresses
Russian emigrants to Germany
Russian people of German descent
German people of Russian descent
People from Blagoveshchensk
Actresses from Berlin
German television actresses